Supermen Against the Orient is a 1973 superhero film directed by Bitto Albertini. It is a sequel of Gianfranco Parolini's  1967 film The Three Fantastic Supermen.

It was a commercial success in Italy and also in Hong Kong.

Plot
FBI agent Robert Wallace has orders to find six Americans who have gone missing in Bangkok. The trace leads to Hong Kong. During his investigation he makes new friends who stand by his side when he is attacked by henchmen.

Cast
 Robert Malcolm as Robert Wallace 
 Antonio Cantafora as Max 
 Salvatore Borgese as Jerry 
 Lo Lieh as Master Tang 
 Shih Szu as mysterious young lady
 Tung Lin as Chen-Loh 
 Alberto Farnese as Colonel Roger 
 Jacques Dufilho as American ambassador
 Isabella Biagini as the ambassador's wife

Production
Supermen Against the Orient was an Italian and Hong Kong co-production. After the death of Bruce Lee, the market for Hong Kong film productions became more restricted. Censorship in Singapore and a quota system for local films in Thailand meant that there was a smaller demand for products from large Hong Kong studios like Shaw Brothers and Golden Harvest. This led to both companies seeking respite in overseas productions such as the hybrids between the British Hammer Films (The Legend of the 7 Golden Vampires), Rapid Films with their German co-production Enter the Seven Virgins (1974) and Italy's I.N.D.I.E.F. for Supermen Against the Orient.

The film differs from other entries in the Three Supermen series as Italo Martinenghi's company Cinesecolo had nothing to do with the production.

Jackie Chan is credited among the choreographers in the film.

Release
Supermen Against the Orient was released in Italy in 1973.

Reception
Kevin Lyons from The EOFFTV Review stated the film presented "lots of very silly" moments and an "embarrassing collection of worn-out gags". However, he considered it amusing for slapstick fans.  Andrew Pragasam from The Spinning Image described the film as a "lively, if meandering romp" with a "memorably silly theme song".

References

Footnotes

Sources

External links
 
 
 

1973 films
Italian superhero films
Hong Kong superhero films
Film superheroes
Films directed by Bitto Albertini
1970s superhero films
Films scored by Nico Fidenco
1970s Italian films
1970s Hong Kong films